Saliger is a surname. Notable people with the surname include:

Alois Benjamin Saliger (1880–1969), American inventor and businessman
Johannes Saliger, Lutheran theologian
Stefan Saliger (born 1967), German field hockey player

See also
Salinger